The Good Person of Szechwan (first translated less literally as The Good Man of Setzuan) is a play written by the German dramatist Bertolt Brecht, in collaboration with Margarete Steffin and Ruth Berlau. The play was begun in 1938 but not completed until 1941, while the author was in exile in the United States. It was first performed in 1943 at the Zürich Schauspielhaus in Switzerland, with a musical score and songs by Swiss composer Huldreich Georg Früh. Today, Paul Dessau's composition of the songs from 1947–48, also authorized by Brecht, is the better-known version. The play is an example of Brecht's "non-Aristotelian drama", a dramatic form intended to be staged with the methods of epic theatre. The play is a parable set in the Chinese "city of Sichuan".

Themes
Originally, Brecht planned to call the play The Product Love (Die Ware Liebe), meaning "love as a commodity". This title was a play on words, since the German term for "true love" (Die wahre Liebe) is pronounced the same way.

The play follows a young prostitute, Shen Teh, as she struggles to lead a life that is "good" according to the terms of the morality taught by the gods, and to which her fellow citizens of Szechwan (Sichuan) pay no regard, without allowing herself to be abused and trodden upon by those who would accept and, more often than not, abuse her goodness. Her neighbors and friends prove so brutal in the filling of their bellies that Shen Teh is forced to invent an alter ego to protect herself: a male cousin named Shui Ta, who becomes a cold and stern protector of Shen Teh's interests. The theme of qualitative "goodness" (which seemed so simple and obvious in the title of the play) is rendered unstable by application to both genders, as Shen Teh realizes she must operate under the guise of both in order to live a good life. It has been argued that Brecht's use of the literary device of the split character in this play is a representation of the antagonism between individual-being and species-being that underlies bourgeois societies.

Brecht's interest in historical materialism is evident in the play's definition of contemporary morality and altruism in social and economic terms. Shen Teh's altruism conflicts with Shui Ta's capitalist ethos of exploitation. The play implies that economic systems determine a society's morality.

Plot summary
The play opens with Wong, a water seller, explaining to the audience that he is on the city outskirts awaiting the foretold appearance of several important gods. Soon the gods arrive and ask Wong to find them shelter for the night. They are tired, having travelled far and wide in search of good people who still live according to the principles that they, the gods, have handed down. Instead they have found only greed, evil, dishonesty, and selfishness. The same turns out to be true in Szechwan: no one will take them in, no one has the time or means to care for others – no one except the poor young prostitute Shen Teh, whose pure inherent charity cannot allow her to turn away anyone in need. Shen Teh was going to see a customer, but decides to help out instead; however, confusion follows, leaving Wong fleeing from the illustrious Ones and leaving his water carrying pole behind.

Shen Teh is rewarded for her hospitality, as the gods take it as a sure sign of goodness. They give her money and she buys a humble tobacco shop which they intend as both gift and test: will Shen Teh be able to maintain her goodness with these newfound means, however slight they may be? If she succeeds, the gods' confidence in humanity would be restored. Though at first Shen Teh seems to live up to the gods' expectations, her generosity quickly turns her small shop into a messy, overcrowded poorhouse which attracts crime and police supervision. In a sense, Shen Teh quickly fails the test, as she is forced to introduce the invented cousin Shui Ta as overseer and protector of her interests. Shen Teh dons a costume of male clothing, a mask, and a forceful voice to take on the role of Shui Ta. Shui Ta arrives at the shop, coldly explains that his cousin has gone out of town on a short trip, curtly turns out the hangers-on, and quickly restores order to the shop.

At first, Shui Ta only appears when Shen Teh is in a particularly desperate situation, but as the action of the play develops, Shen Teh becomes unable to keep up with the demands made on her and is overwhelmed by the promises she makes to others. Therefore, she is compelled to call on her cousin's services for longer periods until at last her true personality seems to be consumed by her cousin's severity. Where Shen Teh is soft, compassionate, and vulnerable, Shui Ta is unemotional and pragmatic, even vicious; it seems that only Shui Ta is made to survive in the world in which they live. In what seems no time at all, he has built her humble shop into a full-scale tobacco factory with many employees.

Shen Teh also meets an unemployed male pilot, Yang Sun, with whom she quickly falls in love after preventing him from hanging himself. However, Yang Sun doesn't return Shen Teh's feelings but simply uses her for money and Shen Teh quickly falls pregnant with his child.

Eventually one of the employees hears Shen Teh crying, but when he enters only Shui Ta is present. The employee demands to know what he has done with Shen Teh, and when he cannot prove where she is, he is taken to court on the charge of having hidden or possibly murdered his cousin. The townspeople also discover a bundle of Shen Teh's clothing under Shui Ta's desk, which makes them even more suspicious. During the process of her trial, the gods appear in the robes of the judges, and Shui Ta says that he will make a confession if the room is cleared except for the judges. When the townspeople have gone, Shui Ta reveals herself to the gods, who are confronted by the dilemma that their seemingly arbitrary divine behavior has caused: they have created impossible circumstances for those who wish to live "good" lives, yet they refuse to intervene directly to protect their followers from the vulnerability that this "goodness" engenders.

At the end, following a hasty and ironic (though literal) deus ex machina, the narrator throws the responsibility of finding a solution to the play's problem onto the shoulders of the audience. It is for the spectator to figure out how a good person can possibly come to a good end in a world that, in essence, is not good. The play relies on the dialectical possibilities of this problem, and on the assumption that the spectator will be moved to see that the current structure of society must be changed in order to resolve the problem.

Productions

The first English-language performance in Britain, as The Good Woman of Setzuan, was given at the Progress Theatre in Reading, Berkshire in 1953.

Andrei Serban directed the Great Jones Repertory Company in productions of The Good Woman of Setzuan with music by Elizabeth Swados at La MaMa Experimental Theatre Club in 1975, 1976, and 1978. The company also took the production on tour in Europe in 1976.

Composer/lyricist Michael Rice created a full-length musical version with Eric Bentley which premiered in 1985 at the Arkansas Repertory Theatre, directed by Cliff Baker. This version was subsequently licensed through Samuel French.

Episode five of the eighth season of the television series Cheers, "The Two Faces of Norm", was based on the play.

David Harrower created a new translation entitled The Good Soul of Szechuan, which opened at the Young Vic theatre in London from May 8 - June 28, 2008, with Jane Horrocks as Shen Te/Shui Ta and a score and songs by David Sawer. This retained several features of the 1943 version, including the themes of heroin and drug-dealing.

Indian theatre director Arvind Gaur directed an Indian adaptation of this play by Amitabha Srivastava (National School of Drama) in 1996 with Deepak Dobriyal, Manu Rishi and Aparna Singh as lead actors.

In December 2009, Arvind Gaur reinterpreted this play with well-known activist and performer Mallika Sarabhai as Shen Te/Shui Ta.

In August/September 2016, Ernie Nolan directed the play at the Cor Theater in Chicago. The role of Shen Te/Shui Ta was played by a male actor (Will Von Vogt) and the setting was a contemporary Chicago ghetto. Tony Kushner's 1997 adaptation was used.

Reception
Charles Marowitz listed The Good Person of Szechwan among Brecht's major plays in 1972.

Notes

Further reading
 Bentley, Eric, trans. & ed. 2007. The Good Woman of Setzuan. By Bertolt Brecht. London: Penguin. .
 Brecht, Bertolt, and Eric Bentley. The Good Woman of Setzuan. New York: Grove Press, 1965. Print.
 Harrower, David, trans. 2008. The Good Soul of Szechuan. By Bertolt Brecht. London: Methuen. .
 Hofmann, Michael, trans. 1990. The Good Person of Sichuan: The National Theatre Version. By Bertolt Brecht. Methuen Modern Plays ser. London: Methuen. .
Willett, John and Ralph Manheim, eds. 1994. The Good Person of Szechwan. Trans. Willett. In Collected Plays: Six. By Bertolt Brecht. Bertolt Brecht: Plays, Poetry, Prose. London: Methuen. 1–111. .

Plays by Bertolt Brecht
Compositions by Paul Dessau
1943 plays
Plays set in China
Sichuan in fiction